The Baskatong Reservoir is a man-made lake in western Quebec, Canada. It was formed following the construction of the Mercier Dam (fr) in 1927 and has an area of 413 km2. Since 2007, a 55 MW generating station is in operation at the site of the dam, the reservoir also being used to control the flow of the Gatineau River for several hydroelectric generating stations downstream.

Its primary source is the Gatineau River. Other significant sources are:
 Gens de Terre River
 Notawassi River (fr) 
 Rivière d'Argent (fr)

Baskatong Reservoir is accessible by several short forest roads off Route 117, about 200 km (124 mi) north of Ottawa, and about 290 km (180 mi) north-west from Montreal.

Fish species

Baskatong Reservoir is a popular location for fishing and has over 20 outfitters established on its shores. Fish species present are walleye, northern pike, lake trout, whitefish, and landlocked salmon.

See also
List of lakes of Quebec

References

External links

Baskatong outfitters association
Gatineau Valley Tourism site

Reservoirs in Quebec
Lakes of Laurentides
Lakes of Outaouais
Tourist attractions in Laurentides